King Faisal may refer to:

People
 Faisal of Saudi Arabia (1903 or 1906–1975)
 Faisal I of Iraq (1883–1933), king of Greater Syria and king of Iraq
 Faisal II of Iraq (1935–1958) Iraq's last king

Places
King Faisal Airbase, Tabuk, Saudi Arabia
King Faisal Airbase (Jordan), Al Jafr, Jordan 
King Faisal University, Dammam, Saudi Arabia
King Faisal Mosque (disambiguation)
Faisal Mosque in Islamabad, Pakistan
King Faisal Mosque, Sharjah, United Arab Emirates
King Faisal Specialist Hospital, Riyadh, Saudi Arabia
King Faisal Street, Syria
King Faisal Air Academy, Riyadh, Saudi Arabia
King Faisal Naval Base

Organizations
King Faisal Babes, football (soccer) club in Ghana
King Faisal Foundation
King Faisal International Prize, given by the foundation